Jesus and the Eyewitnesses: The Gospels as Eyewitness Testimony is a book written by biblical scholar and theologian Richard Bauckham and published in 2006 (Grand Rapids: Eerdmans).

The book challenges the consensus view that, "while the eyewitnesses originated (at least some of) the traditions about Jesus, these were then transmitted as anonymous traditions in the early Christian communities, developing in all sorts of ways in the process, and reached the Gospel writers as the product of such community transmission and development." It argues that the synoptic Gospels are based "quite closely" on the testimony of eyewitnesses, while one (the Gospel of John) is written by an eyewitness, which he argues is John the Elder. The final chapter offers a theological argument against the dichotomy between the Christ of faith and the historical Jesus.

Ben Witherington III described Jesus and the Eyewitnesses as a paradigm shift in Gospels study. In a special issue of the Journal for the Study of the Historical Jesus devoted to the book, Samuel Byrskog described it as "a remarkable achievement which rightly places the role of eyewitnesses in early Christianity on the international scholarly agenda and points to its historical and theological significance." According to Judith  CS Redman, this book also contributes among others to "offer a new paradigm which does not ignore the Fourth Gospel in the search for historical information about Jesus". According to historical Jesus scholar Sara Parks it is "a blend of careful work which contributes to scholarly knowledge, and of heavy bias which only contributes to the polemical din" which "has always characterized Historical Jesus Research".

It was awarded the 2007 Christianity Today book award  in biblical studies and, in 2009, it received the Michael Ramsey Prize for theological writing, one of the judges stating that the work “placed something of a bomb under a good deal of New Testament scholarship".

Bauckham reflected in a 2016 debate on Premier Christian Radio that when the book was first published there was a "huge range of reactions, from people who are wildly enthusiastic to people who absolutely hate it", and noted that his debate partner Bart D. Ehrman disagreed with his conclusions.

An expanded second edition of Jesus and the Eyewitnesses was published by Eerdmans in 2017.

References

Historical perspectives on Jesus
2006 books